The Mets–Willets Point station (formerly Willets Point–Shea Stadium station) is a rapid transit station on the IRT Flushing Line of the New York City Subway. Located near the Citi Field baseball stadium, It is served by the 7 train at all times and by the express <7> train rush hours in the peak direction or after sporting events. This station is located near Flushing Meadows–Corona Park in Willets Point, Queens, on Roosevelt Avenue between 114th and 126th Streets.

The station opened on May 7, 1927, as a local station named Willets Point Boulevard, with two side platforms and three tracks. It was rebuilt into the current layout of three tracks, two side platforms, and a center island platform for the 1939 New York World's Fair. The overpass to Flushing Meadows–Corona Park was rebuilt in the early 1940s. Ahead of the 1964 New York World's Fair, the original wooden platforms were replaced with more durable concrete slabs; shortly afterward, the station was renamed for the nearby Shea Stadium. After Shea Stadium was replaced by Citi Field in 2009, the station was renamed after the New York Mets baseball team, and a ramp was added to the Flushing-bound side platform. A connection to the proposed AirTrain LaGuardia people mover system was announced in 2015, but the people mover was canceled in 2023.

The station's peak use occurs during Mets games at Citi Field (and at Shea Stadium from 1964 until 2008), located on the north side of the station, and during events at the USTA National Tennis Center, on the south side. The side platform for Manhattan-bound local trains, as well as the island platform for express trains and Flushing-bound local trains, are in regular use. The side platform for Flushing-bound local trains is wheelchair-accessible but is only open during sports games and special events; the other platforms are not wheelchair-accessible.

History

Construction and opening

The 1913 Dual Contracts called for the Interborough Rapid Transit Company (IRT) and Brooklyn Rapid Transit Company (BRT; later Brooklyn–Manhattan Transit Corporation, or BMT) to build new lines in Brooklyn, Queens, and the Bronx. Queens did not receive many new IRT and BRT lines compared to Brooklyn and the Bronx, since the city's Public Service Commission (PSC) wanted to alleviate subway crowding in the other two boroughs first before building in Queens, which was relatively undeveloped. The IRT Flushing Line was to be one of two Dual Contracts lines in the borough, along with the Astoria Line; it would connect Flushing and Long Island City, two of Queens' oldest settlements, to Manhattan via the Steinway Tunnel. When the majority of the line was built in the early 1910s, most of the route went through undeveloped land, and Roosevelt Avenue had not been constructed. Community leaders advocated for more Dual Contracts lines to be built in Queens to allow development there. The Flushing Line west of 103rd Street opened in 1917. The IRT agreed to operate the line under the condition that any loss of profits would be repaid by the city. In 1923, the BMT started operating shuttle services along the Flushing Line, which terminated at Queensboro Plaza.

As part of the Dual Contracts, the PSC would build the line eastward to at least Flushing. Three stations at Main Street, Willets Point Boulevard, and 111th Street were approved in 1921 as part of an extension of the Flushing Line past 103rd Street. Construction of the station and the double-deck bridge over the Flushing Creek began on April 21, 1923. The line to Main Street had been practically completed by 1925, but it had to be rebuilt in part due to the sinking of the foundations of the structure in the vicinity of Flushing Creek. Once the structure was deemed to be safe for operation, the line was extended to Willets Point Boulevard on May 7, 1927. The station's opening was formally celebrated on that date, coinciding with the opening of the Roosevelt Avenue Bridge for cars and buses. Until the Main Street station was completed, trains temporarily terminated at Willets Point Boulevard, where passengers boarded a shuttle bus to travel across the creek to Flushing. The Willets Point Boulevard extension was served by shuttle trains from 111th Street until through service was inaugurated on May 14.

The BMT used wooden elevated rolling stock, as the Flushing Line was built to IRT clearances, and standard steel BMT subway rolling stock were not compatible. Furthermore, because the Main Street station was underground, all elevated trains on the Flushing Line had to terminate at Willets Point Boulevard, as elevated trains were banned in subway tunnels. On January 22, 1928, the line was extended one stop east to Main Street. Afterward, Willets Point Boulevard was by far the least used station on the Flushing Line; it recorded 66,042 entries in 1930, whereas every other station on the line had at least one million passengers. After the Long Island Rail Road closed its Whitestone Branch to the neighborhood of Whitestone in early 1932, there were proposals to connect the branch with the subway at the Willets Point Boulevard station, but this did not happen.

20th-century modifications

1939 World's Fair 
The site just south of the Willets Point Boulevard station was remodeled into Flushing Meadows–Corona Park in advance of the 1939 New York World's Fair. In December 1936, the IRT announced plans to expand the Willets Point Boulevard station to accommodate additional crowds for the World's Fair. The station would contain three platforms and four tracks, capable of serving 40 trains per hour in each direction. Expansion of the Willets Point Boulevard station, as well as the construction of an Independent Subway System (IND) line to a planned World's Fair station nearby, was seen as essential for World's Fair access. In January 1937, the World's Fair Corporation presented plans for the Willets Point Boulevard station's expansion to the New York City Board of Estimate, which voted to provide $650,000 for the project. The Manhattan Railway Company, which operated the IRT's elevated lines, opposed the planned expansion because it would put the IRT and IND in direct competition, but a federal judge ruled that the project could proceed.

Work on an overpass between the Willets Point Boulevard station and Flushing Meadows Park commenced in late 1937. Ramps and stairs were built from each platform to the overpass, where 16 turnstiles and a canopy were installed. Construction on the station itself began in January 1938, at which point the project had a budget of $494,000. The station had been revised to three tracks and three platforms. The center track and platform would be served by express trains that terminated at Willets Point Boulevard, while the outer two tracks would be used by local trains to Main Street. The IRT installed signals on the express track, which had previously been used as a storage track, and it built a power substation to allow for more frequent service. The IRT bought 50 World's Fair Lo-V subway cars in conjunction with these upgrades. World's Fair Special express trains began service on April 24, 1939. The fair opened on April 30, and 110,689 people entered the station on that day alone.

1940s and 1950s 
The city government took over the IRT's operations on June 12, 1940. After the World's Fair closed in October 1940, the Willets Point Boulevard station continued to operate, serving Flushing Meadows Park. The overpass to Flushing Meadows Park was reconstructed in 1941. As part of a pilot program aimed at reducing traffic congestion in midtown Manhattan, a park and ride facility with 3,000 parking spots opened next to the Willets Point Boulevard station in November 1947. Many of the Willets Point Boulevard station's riders came from the park-and-ride facility and from United Nations General Assembly meetings in Flushing Meadows Park, but the New York Daily News said in 1949 that the station "serves practically no resident population".

The IRT routes were given numbered designations in 1948 with the introduction of "R-type" rolling stock, which contained rollsigns with numbered designations for each service. The route from Times Square to Flushing became known as the 7. On October 17, 1949, the joint BMT/IRT operation of the Flushing Line ended, and the line became the responsibility of the IRT. After the end of BMT/IRT dual service, the New York City Board of Transportation announced that the Flushing Line platforms would be lengthened to 11 IRT car lengths; the platforms were only able to fit nine 51-foot-long IRT cars beforehand. The platforms at the station were extended in 1955–1956 to accommodate 11-car trains. However, nine-car trains continued to run on the 7 route until 1962, when they were extended to ten cars.

At the end of 1949, the city proposed diverting several bus routes that terminated in Flushing, sending these routes to Willets Point Boulevard. The bus-terminal plan faced great opposition. Critics objected that business near the bus terminals in Flushing would decrease and that travel times from Willets Point Boulevard to points east would increase. Supporters of the plan noted the heavy traffic congestion on Flushing streets and the narrowness of the stairways at the Main Street station. Super-express 7 trains started serving the station in 1953, running nonstop between Queensboro Plaza and Willets Point Boulevard during rush hours in the peak direction. The super-express service was discontinued in 1956.

1964 World's Fair and Shea Stadium 

In 1960, the New York City Transit Authority (NYCTA) proposed upgrading the station in advance of the 1964 New York World's Fair, which was to be held at Flushing Meadows. The plans included rebuilding the walkway between the station and the park; the Willets Point Boulevard station would be the closest stop to the fair, since the World's Fair Line was not planned to be rebuilt. The NYCTA set aside $3.2 million for the expansion of the Willets Point Boulevard station and the nearby Corona Yard. Around the same time, Shea Stadium was built north of the Willets Point Boulevard station as a baseball stadium for the New York Mets. To make way for Shea Stadium, the Willets Point Boulevard park-and-ride facility was closed in 1962 and replaced with a 1,200-space parking lot south of the station. A direct ramp was built from the station to Flushing Meadows Park to accommodate increased crowds. The wooden platforms were also replaced with more durable concrete slabs.

With the opening of the World's Fair in April 1964, trains were lengthened to eleven cars, and the NYCTA bought 430 R33 and R36 "World's Fair" cars to provide this enhanced service. The station was renamed Willets Point–Shea Stadium. The "Willets Point" in the station's name is derived from the boulevard. The area near the Willets Point Boulevard station became known as Willets Point during the 20th century.

One of Shea Stadium's parking lots, adjacent to the station, was expanded in 1978, becoming a park-and-ride facility with 1,500 spaces. In 1983, Donald Trump proposed erecting a football stadium within Flushing Meadows–Corona Park and have the city government renovate the Willets Point subway station; however, the stadium was never built.

21st century

The MTA reintroduced express service to Manhattan at the conclusion of New York Mets weeknight games in July 2007. Super-express trains to Manhattan also started operating after weekend games in April 2008. The super-express trains run for approximately one hour after the game and only make three stops in Queens before entering Manhattan: 61st Street–Woodside, Queensboro Plaza, and Court Square.

After Shea Stadium was replaced with Citi Field in 2009, the Metropolitan Transportation Authority renamed the stop Mets–Willets Point, omitting the corporate-sponsored name associated with the current stadium. Citigroup had sponsored the new baseball field but did not sign a naming rights deal with the MTA. Had the naming rights deal been achieved, the station would have been known as Willets Point–Citi Field. In conjunction with Citi Field's construction, the MTA also spent $40 million to renovate the subway and LIRR stations at Willets Point, including $18 million on the subway station. The MTA repainted the station, replaced lighting, and renovated the platforms. A ramp to the northbound side platform was rehabilitated, making that platform compliant with the Americans with Disabilities Act of 1990 (ADA). However, the other platforms remained inaccessible, prompting protests from disability rights advocates. Except for game days, the Mets–Willets Point station remained sparsely used, with 4,155 passengers on an average weekday in 2014.

Unbuilt AirTrain station 
On January 20, 2015, New York Governor Andrew Cuomo announced a plan to build AirTrain LaGuardia, a people mover running along the Grand Central Parkway and connecting the station to LaGuardia Airport. The project would have included a $50 million renovation of the Willets Point subway station, which would have become fully accessible. In May 2017, Parsons Brinckerhoff was hired to design the AirTrain; at the time, construction was projected to start in 2019. Transportation advocates criticized the plan as being overly roundabout. In October 2021, Kathy Hochul, who succeeded Cuomo as governor after his resignation, directed PANYNJ to pause the AirTrain project. The PANYNJ presented 14 alternatives in March 2022, and the AirTrain LGA project was canceled in March 2023 in favor of increased bus service.

Station layout

The Mets–Willets Point station contains three tracks and three platforms. From compass north to south, there is a southbound side platform, southbound track for Manhattan-bound local trains (internally known as track 1), center express track (track M), island platform, northbound track for Flushing-bound local trains (track 2), and northbound side platform. It is served by 7 local trains at all times and by <7> express trains during rush hours in the peak direction. Northbound local trains normally open their doors on the island platform. The northbound side platform is used only during Mets games and events at the National Tennis Center, such as the U.S. Open. Some 7 local trains terminate at this station during the evening rush hour.

West of the station, there are switches between the local tracks, the express track, and the northern layup track to 111th Street. East of the station, switches allow trains on the express track in either direction to switch to the local track, but not vice versa.

Exits

On the south side of the station, a wheelchair-accessible ramp connects the mezzanine and the northbound (southern) side platform to a footbridge, known as the Passarelle Boardwalk, which passes over Corona Yard and connects to the Mets–Willets Point station on the Long Island Rail Road (LIRR)'s Port Washington Branch, before entering the grounds of the National Tennis Center.

A wooden mezzanine is located underneath the tracks and platforms, with two ramps to the southbound platform and two stairways to the island platform. The north side of the station has a stairway, which formerly led to Shea Stadium but now leads directly to Citi Field's Jackie Robinson Rotunda. The mezzanine contains a station agent's booth, as well as a main fare control area with several turnstiles and an emergency-exit door. Typically, passengers enter the station through the main fare control area, but these turnstiles are deactivated during Mets games, allowing pedestrians to walk between the LIRR station to the south and Citi Field to the north without paying a fare. During Mets games, the ramps to the southbound platform and the stairs to the island platform are accessed by their own fare-control areas, each with several turnstiles.

Accessibility

The Mets–Willets Point station is generally not accessible to passengers with disabilities, except during sporting events, when the northbound side platform is open. In 2009, the MTA built a ramp from the south side of Roosevelt Avenue to the station mezzanine. The two existing ramps from the mezzanine to station level were modified to make them ADA-accessible; the work cost $4 million. The ramps are owned and maintained by the New York City Department of Parks and Recreation.

Some riders with disabilities were unhappy that the station was not made completely accessible during the station's renovation. By contrast, other New York City Subway stations that serve sports venues, including 161st Street–Yankee Stadium for Yankee Stadium, 34th Street–Penn Station at Seventh Avenue and Eighth Avenue for Madison Square Garden, and Atlantic Avenue–Barclays Center for Barclays Center, are completely accessible. Northbound local trains open their doors on the side platform during games and special events only; the platform typically opens 90 minutes before an event and closes 90 minutes afterward. The southbound platform and the center platform are not wheelchair-accessible. Transit advocates also complained the Willets Point station's lack of accessibility outside of game days; aside from Willets Point, only four of the Flushing Line's 18 stations in Queens were accessible.

A footbridge had formerly extended north over Casey Stengel Plaza, leading to a long, circular staircase with turnstiles at the bottom, bringing people close to Gate E at Shea Stadium. In 2008, the footbridge and turnstiles were removed and replaced with a wider stairway which is now situated at Mets Plaza, close to Citi Field's Jackie Robinson Rotunda.  The arrangement of turnstiles in the mezzanine was also reconfigured to improve the post-game pedestrian flows and allow fans to use all ramps, whether they were using the subway or walking across the Passarelle Boardwalk to reach the Long Island Rail Road station or parking lots in Flushing Meadows–Corona Park.

Notes

References

External links

 
 Station Reporter — 7 Train
 The Subway Nut — Mets–Willets Point Pictures
 Willets Point entrance from Google Maps Street View
 Ramp entrance from Google Maps Street View
 Platforms from Google Maps Street View

1927 establishments in New York City
Flushing Meadows–Corona Park
IRT Flushing Line stations
New York City Subway stations in Queens, New York
Port Authority of New York and New Jersey AirTrain
Railway stations in the United States opened in 1927